Hafstein is a surname. Notable people with the surname include:

Hannes Hafstein (1861–1922), Icelandic politician and poet
Jóhann Hafstein (1915–1980), Icelandic politician and Prime Minister of Iceland
Valdimar Tr. Hafstein (born 1972), Icelandic folklorist and ethnologist